Psilocybe antioquiensis is a species of mushroom-forming fungus in the family Hymenogastraceae. It is in the section Zapotecorum of the genus Psilocybe, other members of this section include Psilocybe muliercula, Psilocybe angustipleurocystidiata, Psilocybe aucklandii, Psilocybe collybioides, Psilocybe kumaenorum, Psilocybe zapotecorum, Psilocybe kumaenorum, Psilocybe subcaerulipes, Psilocybe pintonii, Psilocybe moseri, Psilocybe zapotecoantillarum, and Psilocybe zapotecocaribaea.

See also
List of psilocybin mushrooms
Psilocybin mushrooms

References

antioquiensis
Entheogens
Psychoactive fungi
Psychedelic tryptamine carriers
Fungi of North America
Fungi of Colombia
Fungi described in 1994
Taxa named by Gastón Guzmán